Parkash Chand Garg is an Indian politician and a member of Shiromani Akali Dal. He served as MLA of Sangrur from 2012 to 2017 and was succeeded by Vijay Inder Singla of INC. In 2007, he lost to Congress candidate Surinder Pal Singh Sibia by 12,010 votes. In 2012, he defeated Sibia by 4,645 votes. In 2017, he lost to Vijay Inder Singla.

Electoral Performance

Punjab Assembly

References 

Shiromani Akali Dal politicians
Living people
1952 births
Punjab, India MLAs 2012–2017
People from Sangrur